Gromia dubia is a species of testate rhizarian animal in the family Gromiidae. It is known from a single specimen discovered in 1884 by Gruber, and no other specimens have been found. Gruber did not actually make a proper description of the species itself.

See also
 Gromia
 Testate amoeba

References

Gromiidea
Amoeboids
Cercozoa species